Hugo Dewar (9 August 1908 – June 1980) was an author, poet, and political activist influential in co-founding two of the earliest British Trotskyist groups.

Dewar was born in Leyton in London in 1908. He joined the Independent Labour Party in 1928, and in 1930 co-founded the Marxian League (aka Marxist League). He joined the Communist Party of Great Britain in 1931, but was expelled the following year. He was one of the founders in 1932 of the Communist League, and remained active in International Left Opposition groups until he was drafted into the army in 1943. He worked as an adult education tutor.

In 1946, Dewar stood unsuccessfully for the ILP in the Battersea North by-election.

In early 1938 in London, Dewar married Margareta Watzova (1901-1995), a fellow Communist and Trotskyist, who had been born in Latvia in the Russian Empire.

Dewar died in West Sussex in 1980.

Selected bibliography
Assassins at Large (Wingate, 1951)
The Modern Inquisition (Wingate, 1953)
Communist Politics in Britain: The CPGB From its Origins to the Second World War (Pluto, 1976)

References

External links 
 Hugo Dewar Archive at Marxists Internet Archive
 Catalogue of Dewar's papers, held at the Modern Records Centre, University of Warwick

1908 births
1980 deaths
English Trotskyists
Communist Party of Great Britain members
Communist League (UK, 1932) members
People from Leyton
British Communist writers
Independent Labour Party parliamentary candidates